Dorothy Pilley Richards (16 September 1894 in Camberwell, London – 24 September 1986 in Cambridge) was a prominent mountaineer.   She began climbing in Wales and joined the Fell & Rock Climbing Club, later helping found the Pinnacle Club in 1921.

In the 1920s, she climbed extensively in the Alps, Britain, and North America after her marriage to educator, literary critic and rhetorician Ivor Richards.

In 1928, she made the celebrated first ascent of the north north west ridge of the Dent Blanche in the Swiss Alps, with Joseph Georges, Antoine Georges and her husband, which she described in her well-regarded memoir, Climbing Days (1935).

Pilley's great-great-nephew Dan Richards has written a biography of her, published by Faber and Faber in 2016 and also called Climbing Days.

References

Sources
Dorothy Pilley (Mrs. I. A. Richards), Climbing Days (London: Bell, 1935)
Carol A. Osborne, "Richards , Dorothy Eleanor (1894–1986)" in the Oxford Dictionary of National Biography, Oxford University Press, 2004

Gallery

English mountain climbers
1894 births
1986 deaths
Female climbers
People from Camberwell